Ravensburg (Swabian: Raveschburg) is a city in Upper Swabia in Southern Germany, capital of the district of Ravensburg, Baden-Württemberg.

Ravensburg was first mentioned in 1088. In the Middle Ages, it was an Imperial Free City and an important trading centre. The "Great Ravensburg Trading Society" (Große Ravensburger Handelsgesellschaft) owned shops and trading companies all over Europe.

The historic city centre is still very much intact, including three city gates and over 10 towers of the medieval fortification. "The all-white Mehlsack (Flour sack) is a tower marking the Altstadt’s southern edge. A steep staircase leads up to the Veitsburg, a quaint baroque castle."

History
Ravensburg was first mentioned in writing in 1088. It was founded by the Welfs, a Frankish dynasty in Swabia who became later Dukes of Bavaria and Saxony and who made the castle of Ravensburg their ancestral seat.

By a contract of inheritance, in 1191 the Hohenstaufen Frederick Barbarossa acquired the ownership of Ravensburg from Welf VI, Duke of Spoleto and uncle of both Frederick Barbarossa and Henry the Lion.
With the death of Conradin 1268 in Naples the Hohenstaufen line became extinct. Their former estates became imperial property of the Holy Roman Empire. Like many other cities in Swabia, at the end of the 13th century Ravensburg became an Imperial Free City in 1276.

The "Great Ravensburg Trading Society" (Große Ravensburger Handelsgesellschaft) was founded at Ravensburg and Konstanz around 1380 by the merchant families of Humpis (from Ravensburg), Mötteli (from Buchhorn, modern-day Friedrichshafen) and Muntprat (from Constance). At first, the society mostly dealt in the production of linen and fustian. With the opening of one of the first paper mills north of the Alps in 1402 in Ravensburg, paper became another commodity. The Ravensburg stores also sold oriental spices, Mediterranean wines and Bohemian ores. After the liquidation of the Great Ravensburg Trading Society in 1530, Ravensburg stagnated economically. The Thirty Years' War caused a grave decline of the population. Swedish troops destroyed the old castle, now named "Veitsburg" after the St. Veit chapel at the castle grounds.

Following the Reformation a "paritetic" government emerged, meaning an equal distribution of public offices between the Catholic and Protestant confession. The city council was one half each Protestant and Catholic. For some time there was even a Catholic and a Protestant mayor at the same time, and both confessions celebrated the village fair, the "Rutenfest", apart from each other. This system was approved at the end of the Thirty Years' War in the Peace of Westphalia (1648) which named four "Paritetic Imperial Cities": Augsburg, Biberach, Dinkelsbühl and Ravensburg.

In 1803 the Immerwährende Reichstag passed the Reichsdeputationshauptschluss, a bill which included the secularisation and mediatisation of many German states — the first meaning the confiscation of the estates belonging to the church, the second the incorporation of the imperial estates and Imperial Free Cities into larger regional states. As a result, Ravensburg first became a Bavarian exclave within Württemberg. After a swap of estates between Bavaria and Württemberg it was incorporated in the Kingdom of Württemberg in 1810.

Since Ravensburg was impoverished and depopulated after the Thirty Years' War, only a few new buildings were raised during the 18th and the early 19th century. The benefit of this economic stagnation was the conservation of a widely intact medieval city with nearly all towers and gates of the historic fortification.

20th century
During World War II Ravensburg was strategically of no relevance. Ravensburg did not harbor any noteworthy arms industry (unlike nearby Friedrichshafen with its large aircraft industry), but was home to a major aid supplies center belonging to the Swiss Red Cross. The historic city centre was not damaged by air raids.

By 1945, the city came into the French occupation zone and thus came in 1947 to the newly founded state of Württemberg-Hohenzollern, which in 1952 merged to the state of Baden-Württemberg.

In the 1970s, Ravensburg increased in population and territory by the incorporation of smaller communities like Eschach, Schmalegg and Taldorf. Ravensburg University of Cooperative Education was established in the city in 1978.

In the 1980s, the Old Town was renovated and all transit traffic was banned from the city centre.

Economy and infrastructure
Ravensburg is a thriving shopping city in the wealthy region of Upper Swabia. Unemployment is relatively low. 
The nearest large cities are Munich, Stuttgart and Zurich, approximately a two-hour drive away each. Ulm, Konstanz and Bregenz are each less than a one-hour drive away.

Ravensburg is part of an urban agglomeration that also comprises Weingarten (Württemberg) and several suburbs. Ravensburg, Weingarten, and Friedrichshafen (on the shores of Lake Constance) share the functionality of a Oberzentrum (that is, the highest-ranked centre in the system of spatial planning and development in Baden-Württemberg).

Transport
Ravensburg is located at a crossing of the federal roads (national highways) B30, B31 and B32. A by-pass highway around Ravensburg and Weingarten was completed recently. The regional airport is situated at Friedrichshafen, about 15 km south of Ravensburg. The nearest national motor-ways are the A7 and A8 (approach at Ulm) and the A96 (approach at Lindau or Wangen im Allgäu).

In 1847, the railway station of Ravensbug was put in operation, part of the so-called "Swabian Railroad" from Stuttgart to Friedrichshafen, the oldest railroad of Württemberg and well known in all of Germany by the folk-style song .

Local businesses
Mechanical engineering has traditionally been the main type of industry in the region. Based on the demand of the paper and textile industries (now widely reduced) and a long tradition of flour, paper and other mills, many engineering factories arose at the end of the 19th century. Today the primary engineering firms in Ravensburg are the left-overs of the former Escher-Wyss AG (a subsidiary of the Swiss Sulzer AG) which are now subsidiaries of the Austrian "Andritz Hydro".

Ravensburger AG, whose headquarters are located in the city, is a company internationally known for board games, jigsaw puzzles and children's books.

The pastry factory :de:Tekrum (Theodor Krumm GmbH & Co. KG) is another company with an internationally known brand name. Since January 2005 it has been a wholly owned subsidiary of Griesson–de Beukelaer.

Other large industrial companies include: 
Vetter Pharma, a manufacturer of pre-filled injection systems
Omira, one of the largest dairies in southern Germany
the tool factory Hawera Probst (a subsidiary of Robert Bosch), the worldwide market leader in hammer drill bits
the component supplier EBZ Engineering Bausch & Ziege (formerly Nothelfer, a subsidiary of ThyssenKrupp Automotive)
the packaging manufacturer "Coveris Rigid" (formerly Autobar Packaging)
two suppliers of solar power systems, Pro Solar Solarstrom and pro solar Energietechnik

Media
The local newspaper is the Schwäbische Zeitung.

The radio companies Radio 7 and Südwestrundfunk run broadcasting studios at Ravensburg.
In Horgenzell near Ravensburg, the Ravensburg-Horgenzell transmitter transmitted Deutschlandfunk on the medium wave frequency 756 kHz.

Culture
The city's most popular festival is the annual "Rutenfest", which takes place mid year.

Sport
The city's association football club FV Ravensburg, formed in 1893, has played in the Oberliga Baden-Württemberg on three occasions from 1978 to 1983, from 1998 to 2000 and again since 2003.

From 2006 to 2010, Ravensburg hosted the Air Canada Cup or MLP Nations Cup, an international women's ice hockey tournament.

Twin towns – sister cities

Ravensburg is twinned with:

 Brest, Belarus
 Coswig, Germany
 Mollet del Vallès, Spain
 Montélimar, France
 Rivoli, Italy
 Rhondda Cynon Taf, Wales, United Kingdom
 Varaždin, Croatia

Notable people

 Henry the Lion (1129/1131–1195), Duke of Saxony and Bavaria, allegedly born on the Ravensburg
 Ladislaus Sunthaym (c. 1440 – c. 1512), historian and geographer
 Hans Buchner (1483–1538), organist and composer
 Joannes Susenbrotus (c. 1484 – c. 1542), humanist, taught in Ravensburg
 Franz Joachim Beich (1666–1748), painter
 August Natterer (1868–1933), art brut artist
 Karl Erb (1877–1958), tenor
 Klaus Schwab (born 1938), economist, founder of the World Economic Forum
 Theo Seiler (born 1949), ophthalmologist and physicist
 Erich Buck, (born 1949), figure skater
 Angelika Buck (born 1950), figure skater 
 Andreas Gestrich (born 1952), historian and director of the German Historical Institute in London
 Gregor Amann (born 1962), politician (SPD), Member of Bundestag 2005–2009
 Kai Diekmann (born 1964), journalist and chief editor of the Bild-Zeitung
 Stefanie Dimmeler (born 1967), biologist and biochemist, Leibniz Prize Winner
 Kofi Ansuhenne (born 1973), boy group singer ("Bed & Breakfast")
 Simon Henzler (born 1976), football player and coach
 Linus Roth (born 1977), classical violinist and academic teacher
 Daniel Unger (born 1978), triathlete, 
 Christoph Meschenmoser (born 1983), cyclist
 Susanne Fellner (born 1985), ice hockey player
 Rahman Soyudogru (born 1989), footballer
 Ömer Toprak (born 1989), Turkish footballer
 Emanuel Buchmann (born 1992), cyclist

References

External links

 
Rutenfest
Blaserturm.de

 
1803 disestablishments
States and territories established in 1276
Towns in Baden-Württemberg
Upper Swabia
Württemberg